Carex elatior is a tussock-forming species of perennial sedge in the family Cyperaceae. It is native to parts of central Madagascar.

The species was first formally described by the botanist Johann Otto Boeckeler in 1880 as a part of the work Abhandlungen herausgegeben vom Naturwissenschaftlichen Vereins zu Bremen. It has one synonym; Carex elatior var. perrieri.

See also
List of Carex species

References

elatior
Taxa named by Johann Otto Boeckeler
Plants described in 1880
Flora of Madagascar